Tarbor-e Lay Bisheh (also Romanized as Tarbor-e Lāy Bīsheh; also known as Tarbor-e Pā’īn) is a village in Darian Rural District, in the Central District of Shiraz County, Fars Province, Iran. At the 2006 census, its population was 1,491, in 320 families.

References 

Populated places in Shiraz County